The IMU Abacus Medal, known before 2022 as the Rolf Nevanlinna Prize, is awarded once every four years at the International Congress of Mathematicians, hosted by the International Mathematical Union (IMU), for outstanding contributions in Mathematical Aspects of Information Sciences including:

All mathematical aspects of computer science, including computational complexity theory, logic of programming languages, analysis of algorithms, cryptography, computer vision, pattern recognition, information processing and modelling of intelligence.
Scientific computing and numerical analysis. Computational aspects of optimization and control theory. Computer algebra.

The prize was established in 1981 by the Executive Committee of the International Mathematical Union and named for the Finnish mathematician Rolf Nevanlinna. It consists of a gold medal and cash prize. The prize is targeted at younger theoretical computer scientists, and only those younger than 40 on January 1 of the award year are eligible. It is awarded along with other IMU prizes including the Fields Medal.

Naming
The prize was originally named to honour the Finnish mathematician Rolf Nevanlinna who had died a year before the prize's creation in 1981. The medal featured a profile of Nevanlinna, the text "Rolf Nevanlinna Prize", and very small characters "RH 83" on its obverse. RH refers to Raimo Heino, the medal's designer, and 83 to the year of first minting. On the reverse, two figures related to the University of Helsinki, the prize sponsor, are engraved. The rim bears the name of the prizewinner.

Alexander Soifer, president of the World Federation of National Mathematics Competitions, complained about the prize's honouring of Nevanlinna, as he was a supporter of Hitler and had acted as a representative for the Finnish Volunteer Battalion of the Waffen-SS during World War II. Soifer discussed Nevanlinna's wartime activities in a 2015 book, and forwarded his personal and his organization’s requests to the Executive Committee of IMU to change the Prize's name. In July 2018, the 18th General Assembly of the IMU decided to remove the name of Rolf Nevanlinna from the prize. It was later announced that the prize would be named the IMU Abacus Medal.

Laureates

See also
 Turing Award
 Gödel Prize
 Abel Prize
Kalinga Prize
 Fields Medal
 Gauss Prize
 Chern Medal
 Schock Prize
 Wolf Prize
 List of computer science awards
 List of mathematics awards

Notes

External links 
IMU Abacus Medal - Official site
Rolf Nevanlinna Prizes – Official site

Computer science awards
Awards of the International Mathematical Union
Awards established in 1981
Information theory
International Congress of Mathematicians